Girls Demand Excitement is a 1931 film starring Virginia Cherrill, John Wayne, and Marguerite Churchill. Wayne and Churchill had starred in the widescreen Western epic The Big Trail the previous year.  The movie was written by Harlan Thompson and directed by Seymour Felix. Wayne stated this film was the worst movie he ever appeared in. A 35mm nitrate work print of this film is stored in the UCLA Film and Television Archive.

Plot
Peter Brooks is a hard-working but struggling college boy who resents girls being allowed to attend college. A wealthy young spoiled socialite named Joan Madison changes his mind when she uses her feminine wiles to entrap him. Later in the film, Brooks's men's basketball team goes up against the college's all-girl team.

Cast
 Virginia Cherrill as Joan Madison
 John Wayne as Peter Brooks
 Marguerite Churchill as Miriam
 Marion Byron as Margery
 Ray Cooke as Jimmie
 Helen Jerome Eddy as Gazella Perkins
 Winter Hall as The Dean
 George Irving as Mr. Madison
 William Janney as Freddie
 Jerry Mandy as Joe
 Addie McPhail as Sue Street
 Edward J. Nugent as Tommy
 Martha Sleeper as Harriet Mundy
 Emerson Treacy as Bobby Cruikshank

See also
 John Wayne filmography

References

External links
 

1931 films
1931 romantic comedy films
American romantic comedy films
American black-and-white films
Fox Film films
1930s English-language films
1930s American films
Silent romantic comedy films